FC Maktaaral (Maqtaaral fýtbol klýby) is a Kazakhstani football club based in Maktaaral District.

History
The club was formed in 2012 and played in Second League. Won and was promoted to First League and finished 16th in its first season in the Kazakhstan First Division.

In 2021 was second in First League and promoted to Premier League.

Domestic history

Squad

Managerial History

References

Association football clubs established in 2011
Football clubs in Kazakhstan
2011 establishments in Kazakhstan